The Oriental Longhair is a variety of domestic cat. It is closely related to the Oriental Shorthair.  The Oriental Longhair in some registries, such as The International Cat Association (TICA), is a separate breed. In others, such as the Cat Fanciers' Association (CFA), it is a division, along with the short-haired variety, of a merged breed, the Oriental.  With no globally recognized naming convention, other cat fanciers may refer to this type as Foreign Longhair or Mandarin. It was formerly known as the British Angora before being renamed in 2002 by British cat fanciers in order to avoid confusion with the Turkish Angora.

Description
Oriental Longhairs feature a long, tubular, Oriental-style body but with a longer silky coat. The range of possible coat colours includes everything from self-coloured (black, blue, chocolate, lilac, cinnamon, caramel, fawn, red, cream and apricot), tortoiseshell, smoke (silver undercoat), shaded or tipped, tabby or white. The eyes are almond shaped. The preferred eye color for Oriental Longhairs is green; except for the whites, which may have green or blue eyes, or be odd-eyed (two different colored eyes). 

If an Oriental Longhair is bred to an Oriental shorthair or a Siamese, the kittens will all be short-haired. This is because the gene for long hair is recessive. The kittens will, however, be a variant, a carrier of the long-hair gene. If such a "variant" is bred to a cat with long hair, or to another variant, they may produce both short-haired and long-haired kittens. Variants may have a slightly longer coat than Oriental Shorthairs, but this is not always the case.

Behavior

The Oriental Longhair is an active cat that likes to play. If the owner does not have the time to do so, it will find a toy to play on its own. This breed enjoys jumping and does it really well, usually without breaking any objects due to its agility and elegance. The oriental longhair is extremely intelligent and are ideal companions for people who like their pets always around. Some have been known to follow their owners everywhere. They are very loyal and most get along well with other cats, especially if they are of the same breed group. These cats are not adapted to a life of living alone and prefer an interactive home. Some Oriental tend to gravitate to one person in the home. Oriental Longhairs, like their cousin breed the Siamese, have loud and expressive voices that are used often. They are smart cats, with some being quite willful in getting their own way. Many Orientals take to leash training quickly if started young. They have been known to open cabinets, doors and even refrigerators. This breed group is often recommended for more experienced cat keepers.

References

External links 

Iams website: Oriental Longhair cat
Oriental Longhair Colour Overview (with photos)

Cat breeds